The London, Midland and Scottish Railway Fowler Class 7F was a class of 0-8-0 steam locomotives. They were a Midlandised version of the London and North Western Railway (LNWR) Class G2 and Class G2A 0-8-0s.  They were also classified as Class G3 under the former LNWR system.  The class were sometimes known as Baby Austins, or Austin 7s, after a motor car that was becoming popular at the time.

Overview

It featured a Belpaire firebox and increased boiler pressure over its predecessor but had the same power rating of 7F. Unfortunately the design had been done at the old Midlands Railway's Derby Works and the drawing office staff insisted on using Midland practice. Among other things this meant that the axle bearings were too small for the loads they had to carry.  E.S. Cox, writing in a series of articles in Trains Illustrated c. 1957, suggests that they had a sufficiently modern and effective front end that, for steady slogging, some drivers preferred them to an LMS Stanier Class 8F. However, this also meant that, with bearings comparable to an LMS Fowler Class 4F and already inadequate for the lower powered engine, the bearings broke up rapidly.

Numbering

Equipment
Numbers 9672–74 were fitted with ACFI feedwater heaters when built but these were removed during the Second World War. After the war, five were briefly converted to oil burning.

British Railways
All members of the class entered British Railways ownership in 1948, but 122 had been withdrawn by the end of 1951; fifty were withdrawn without receiving their BR number. They had a fairly short life, and all were withdrawn and scrapped between 1949 and 1962, some time before the final G2s were withdrawn in 1964.

Accidents and incidents
On 13 March 1935, a milk train was in a rear-end collision with an express freight train at King's Langley, Hertfordshire due to a signalman's error. Another freight train collided with the wreckage. Locomotive No. 9598 was hauling a coal train that ran into the wreckage. One person was killed.
On 14 May 1948, a locomotive of the class was hauling a freight train that ran away and was in collision with an empty stock train at Battyeford, Yorkshire.

Withdrawal 
All engines were withdrawn between 1949 and 1962.

References

Ian Allan ABC of British Railways Locomotives, summer 1961 edition, part 3, page 52

External links

Class 7F-B Details at Rail UK
1935 photo from the late Alan Whitehead collection

7 Class 7F 0-8-0
0-8-0 locomotives
Railway locomotives introduced in 1929
Freight locomotives
Scrapped locomotives
Standard gauge steam locomotives of Great Britain
D h2 locomotives